The 2017–18 season was Charlton Athletic's 96th season in their existence. Along with competing in the League One, the club also participated in the FA Cup, EFL Cup and EFL Trophy. The season covered the period from 1 July 2017 to 30 June 2018.

Squad statistics

~

|}

Top scorers

Disciplinary record

Transfers

Transfers in

Transfers out

Loans in

Loans out

Competitions

Friendlies
On 10 May 2017, Charlton Athletic announced Ipswich Town would visit during pre-season. Opposition number two and three were announced on 15 May 2017, Welling United and Greenwich Borough. A day later, Charlton confirmed a trip to Dover Athletic to the pre-season schedule. On 18 May 2017, Charlton announced they would visit Republic of Ireland as part of their pre-season preparations. Two more friendlies were revealed a day later.

League One

League table

Result summary

Results by round

Matches

League One play-offs

FA Cup

On 16 October 2017, Charlton Athletic were drawn at home to Truro City in the first round. A trip to AFC Wimbledon was confirmed for the second round.

EFL Cup

On 16 June 2017, Charlton Athletic were drawn away to Exeter City in the first round. Another away tie against Norwich City was confirmed for the second round.

EFL Trophy

Kent Senior Cup

References

Charlton Athletic
Charlton Athletic F.C. seasons